Both purple pigeon and purple wood pigeon may refer to either:

 Japanese wood pigeon (C. janthina), of East Asia

 Pale-capped pigeon (C. punicea), of South and Southeast Asia

See also

The Purple Pidgin, mascot of Pidgin instant-messaging software